Bandi Sailu  (1928 – 15 July 2000) or Sayilu Saayilu was a Marxist revolutionary born in a Dalit family in Mandapelli village, Duggondi mandal, Narsampeta Thalukh in the Warangal district of Andhra Pradesh, India.

Biography
Sailu's father was Bandi Ellaiah, mother Bandi Ellamma. His wife's name is Ellavva.

He was interested in Marxism from a very young age, and joined the  Telangana Rebellion with the guerillas “Telangana Raithanga Sayudha Poratam” (Telangana Armed Struggle), inspired by Maddikayala Omkar of the (Communist Party of India), who struggled for freedom and went against the rule of the Nizam of Hyderabad, Osman Ali Khan.

In Warangal District, particularly Narsampeta and Mahboobabad Thalukh, he attacked many feudalist gadhis with his group. They fought against the Nizam Army, the police, and the Rajakars. He ruined the feudalists' ghadis and distributed the money, gold, and grain to the poor. He organized many attacks against the Nizam and Rajakars, and seized lands and distributed thousands of acres to landless poor people.

In 1972 Omkar was elected as an MLA from the Narsampet Assembly Constitution from the Communist Party of India. Omkar was elected continuously for five terms as a MLA in the same constituency for nearly 22 years. Sailu played a vital role in Omkar's victory. He left politics when Omkar was defeated by Revuri Prakash Reddy (Telugu Desam Party) in the 1994 election by only 25 votes. Bandi Sailu felt that Prakash Reddy won the election by spending money and in illegal ways.

External links
Warangal website

1928 births
2000 deaths
Indian Marxists